Ellanthakunta is a mandal in Rajanna Sircilla district in the state of Telangana in India.

References 

Mandals in Rajanna Sircilla district